The Saint John General Hospital was a public hospital in Saint John, New Brunswick.

The hospital was completed in November 1931 and cost $1.6 million to construct. Built on a hill near the center of the city, the 12-storey building, topped with a gleaming metal dome, was a prominent landmark in Saint John's skyline.

The hospital boasted state-of-the-art facilities for its time: in 1932 its new cancer clinic was treating patients with radiation therapy, in 1952 it introduced a neurosurgery department, and in the 1960s it became the first hospital in the region to offer renal dialysis.

The building was expanded in 1959 with the addition of a new wing, but by the late 1970s the facility was dated and many services formerly provided at the General Hospital had moved to newer hospitals. On October 31, 1982, the last patients were moved to other facilities and the hospital officially closed. It remained empty and condemned until December 10, 1995, when the building was demolished by a controlled implosion.

The hospital's dome survived the demolition intact and was pulled from the rubble. It now forms the roof of a gazebo in a small Saint John park, located near Garden Street.

References

External links

Hospital buildings completed in 1931
Hospitals established in 1931
Hospitals in New Brunswick
Buildings and structures in Saint John, New Brunswick
Buildings and structures demolished in 1995
Buildings and structures demolished by controlled implosion
Demolished buildings and structures in Canada
1931 establishments in New Brunswick
1982 disestablishments in New Brunswick
History of Saint John, New Brunswick